"Forever" is a song by Belgian dance music group Dee Dee. It was released in July 2001 as a single and reached number 12 in the United Kingdom the following year.

Track listing
12-inch maxi
 "Forever" (extended version) – 6:42	
 "Forever" (Ian Van Dahl remix) – 8:08	
 "Forever" (Elijah McMillan remix) – 8:18	
 "Forever" (Perfect Sphere remix) – 7:08

Charts

Release history

References

2001 songs
2001 singles